Angeles City National Trade School is a school in Angeles City, Philippines. ACNTS provides technical-vocational education and training.

Courses available at the school include furniture and cabinet making, electricity, animation, computer hardware services, automotive, civil technology, machine shop practice, welding and fabrication, electronics, refrigeration and air conditioning, food trades, garments, cosmetology and drafting.

History 
Angeles City National Trade School was established under Republic Act No. 3380 in June 1967, by the late Congresswoman Juanita L. Nepomuceno, mandated to deliver technical vocational education and training to the less and underprivileged youth of Angeles City, and other neighboring towns of Porac, Santa Rita, Mabalacat, San Fernando, as well as neighboring barrios and barangays.

The school occupies 4.18 hectares donated by the late Governor of Pampanga, Gov. Francisco Nepomuceno, bounded by the highly urbanized Sunset Village. Inside are 29 buildings that serve as classrooms and laboratories, a double size covered court donated by Congressman Blueboy Nepomuceno and Senator Lito Lapid and other learning facilities are made available for the students as their second home.

ACNTS started its first class with only 23 students of poor families who go back home only on weekends, using their classrooms as sleeping quarters at night, to defray their transportation expenses. Starting from an old two story house in front of the Lazatin Vinegar Plant, now the school is located in a highly urbanized Sunset Subdivision in Barangay Cutcut.

External links

Angeles City National Trade School

Vocational education in the Philippines
Schools in Angeles City
Educational institutions established in 1967
1967 establishments in the Philippines